Grado Labs is an American audio manufacturer known for hand building high-end dynamic open-back headphones and cartridges in Brooklyn, New York.

Grado Labs was founded in 1953, by master watchmaker Joseph Grado. The Brooklyn company is currently run by President and CEO John Grado, who bought the company in 1990 after running day-to-day operations since the 1970s.

John's son, Jonathan Grado, recently entered the company as the third generation of Grado.
Grado specializes in dynamic open-air, supra-aural, high-fidelity headphones. In its over 60-year history, Grado has kept a very low profile by relying on word-of-mouth among audio dealers and consumers instead of mass advertising campaigns.  Nearly all of Grado's products are hand-crafted in Brooklyn, New York.

In 2014, Grado released their new line of headphones, The e Series, and was named in the Top Eight Most Social Small Companies in America by Mashable and American Express.

In 2015, JetBlue partnered with Grado to bring their headphones to their Mint Flights.

In 2021, Grado released the Prestige X series of headphones, superseding the Prestige e lineup.

History

Foundation and phono cartridges (1953–1989) 

Grado Labs was founded in 1953, by master watchmaker Joseph Grado. The origins of the audio company date back to the early 1950s, when Joseph left Tiffany & Company and Sherman Fairchild to start crafting phono cartridges at his kitchen table in Brooklyn, NY. After seeing a market for cartridges, he went around the corner and closed the existing Grado fruit shop, opening up Grado Laboratories. Joseph went on to invent the first stereo moving coil phono cartridge while building up Grado's cartridge lineup.

Throughout his time at Grado, the company made cartridges, speakers, turntables, and tonearms, with cartridges being the only product line not discontinued. In 1965 Joseph's nephew, John Grado, got his first job at Grado and began sweeping the floors. John spent time training with his uncle, and in 1975 John started running day-to-day business at his family's company. In 1982, Joseph Grado was inducted into the Audio Hall of Fame. The peak of cartridge production took place in the mid-1980s, reaching 10,000 units a week. Their all-time low took place a few years later, dipping to 12,000 units for a year.

Resurgence and first line of headphones (1990–2012) 

With the company the brink of closing, John Grado bought the company from his uncle in 1990, becoming President and CEO. John created the first line of Grado headphones, building them at a workbench with his wife, Loretta, in the early half of the 1990s. At the time, John and his family lived on the top floor of Grado's Brooklyn building. As the company did not advertise using conventional means, John would travel to audio shows around the world to promote his products. When he had established a sizable distributor list throughout multiple countries, he completely stopped going to shows to spend more time with his family.
At one point, the family was going to build Grado Towers: ceiling tall speakers made of their headphone drivers. With the unexpected immediate success of their first headphones though, the speakers never made it past five pairs. Over the next two decades, John created over three generations of headphone lines and oversaw Grado's cartridge reinvigoration, bringing units per year north of 60,000.

Grado branding update (2013–present) 
In 2013, Jonathan Grado, John's son, entered the company under his father with a goal of modernizing their brand. Originally embarrassed about his family's company, Jonathan had a change of heart in his sophomore year of college and started the Grado Facebook and Twitter pages. The hobby soon became his main focus, becoming Social Media Director over the course of his college career. After graduating and working at Sonos, he started full-time with Grado Labs. Late 2013 brought Grado's first large collaboration, creating an experimental headphone out of Bushmills wooden whiskey barrels, which Gizmodo called "warm and clear, with a sweet-spot right in the mid-range, as Grado products are known for." The New York Times also praised them, although noting they might not fit everyone's budget.

2014 had Jonathan become Vice President of Marketing, but having to get creative due to a "zero dollar ad budget". Soon afterwards in the same year, Grado was named in the Top Eight Most Social Small Companies in America by Mashable and American Express.

In early 2015, JetBlue Airways chose to partner with Grado to be their official headphone for their Mint Class flights.

Joseph Grado died on February 6, 2015, at the age of 90.

Current headphone lineup

Standard wired open-back models

Portable and in-ear models

Past production 

The Joseph Grado Signature Products HP-1000 series headphones were limited to 1000 units produced. The HP-1000 series consisted of the HP1, which had polarity switches, the HP2, which lacked them, and the HP3, which was a short-run variant of the HP2 with looser driver matching.

Grado produced a headphone amplifier called the RA1. It accepted RCA connector input, utilized AC or DC power via two 9-volt batteries. The output was 1/8" (6.35mm), and the circuitry was encased in a wooden chassis.

Grado also manufactured an alternate headphone line for Alessandro Music Products; a maker of higher-end guitar components. Known as The Alessandro Music Series, these models have roughly the same external appearance with those from Grado, but feature a slightly different printed text and lack the identifying "button" of many lower-end Grado models. The series has said to have been designed for the musician market, and encompassed the entry-level MS1 with plastic housing, the MS2 with an aluminum driver housing, and the MS Pro, which featured a mahogany housing similar to that of the RS1.

Phono cartridges 
Each individual cartridge manufactured by Grado is hand assembled and tested for frequency response, channel output, channel balance, phase linearity, inductance and resistance.

Prestige Series 

The Prestige series of cartridges are designed for high output and stability under much use. A considerable tip mass reduction results in a manufacturer-reported frequency response to 50 kHz and tracking forces from 1 to 2 grams.

Prestige models available in both ½" mount and P-mount. 78 RPM styli are available for these models. All styli in the Prestige series are user replaceable.

Reference Series 
The Reference series of wooden cartridges are a fixed coil design, handmade at Grado labs from a specially selected species of mahogany. A curing process is performed between production steps to achieve Grado Labs' desired sound. Unlike the Prestige series, the Reference series generator/stylus module is not replaceable allowing a redesigned one piece magnetic circuit and a reduction of chassis resonances. The Reference Series has been a flagship of Grado Labs since its early history.

All Reference series cartridges are ½" mount. 78 RPM styli are not available with the Reference series. All re-tipping on the Reference series is done by Grado.

Awards 
Consumer Reports named the Grado SR325is as their top headphone of 2014.
Grado Labs was named as Mashable's Top 8 Social Small Companies in America in 2014. 
The Grado SR80i has won the What Hi-Fi? Sound and Vision annual award for "Best home on-ears up to £150" award since 2010.

References

External links 

Interview with John Grado on Head-Fi.org

Electronics companies established in 1953
Companies based in Brooklyn
Audio equipment manufacturers of the United States
Headphones manufacturers
Headphone amplifier manufacturers
Manufacturing companies based in New York City
Privately held companies based in New York City
1953 establishments in New York City